Innsbrook is a village in Warren County, Missouri, United States. The population was 552 at the 2010 census. The village of Innsbrook is comprised almost entirely by Innsbrook Resort—a private, gated community. The village was founded in 1998.

Geography
Innsbrook is located at  (38.764966, −91.057398).

Demographics

2010 census
As of the census of 2010, there were 552 people, 282 households, and 209 families living in the village. The racial makeup of the village was 97.6% White, 1.4% African American, 0.2% from other races, and 0.7% from two or more races. Hispanic or Latino of any race were 0.5% of the population.

There were 282 households, of which 8.2% had children under the age of 18 living with them, 72.3% were married couples living together, 1.1% had a female householder with no husband present, 0.7% had a male householder with no wife present, and 25.9% were non-families. 22.3% of all households were made up of individuals, and 14.5% had someone living alone who was 65 years of age or older. The average household size was 1.96 and the average family size was 2.23.

The median age in the village was 64.5 years. 6.3% of residents were under the age of 18; 1.2% were between the ages of 18 and 24; 6.1% were from 25 to 44; 38.6% were from 45 to 64; and 47.8% were 65 years of age or older. The gender makeup of the village was 47.3% male and 52.7% female.

2000 census
As of the census of 2000, there were 469 people, 222 households, and 172 families living in the village. The racial makeup of the village was 99.57% White and 0.43% African American. Hispanic or Latino of any race were 0.43% of the population.

There were 222 households, out of which 9.0% had children under the age of 18 living with them, 75.2% were married couples living together, 0.5% had a female householder with no husband present, and 22.1% were non-families. 16.2% of all households were made up of individuals, and 5.9% had someone living alone who was 65 years of age or older. The average household size was 2.11 and the average family size was 2.31.

In the village, the population was spread out, with 9.0% under the age of 18, 2.6% from 18 to 24, 11.1% from 25 to 44, 49.0% from 45 to 64, and 28.4% who were 65 years of age or older. The median age was 58 years. For every 100 females, there were 98.7 males. For every 100 females age 18 and over, there were 95.0 males.

The median income for a household in the village was $65,833, and the median income for a family was $70,156. Males had a median income of $51,875 versus $35,000 for females. The per capita income for the village was $40,434. About 0.6% of families and 1.6% of the population were below the poverty line, including none of those under age 18 and 3.0% of those age 65 or over.

References

Villages in Warren County, Missouri
Villages in Missouri